is a Japanese jazz pianist, composer and arranger.

Early life
Satoh was born in Tokyo on 6 October 1941. His mother was Setsu and his father, who owned small businesses, was Yoshiaki Satoh. The house that his family moved into in 1944 contained a piano; Masahiko started playing it at the age of five. He began playing the piano professionally at the age of 17, "accompanying singers, magicians and strippers at a cabaret in the Ginza district".

Later life and career
By 1959 Satoh was playing in Georgie Kawaguchi's band, together with alto saxophonist Sadao Watanabe and tenor saxophonist Akira Miyazawa. Satoh graduated from Keio University.

At the age of 26, Satoh moved to the United States to study at the Berklee College of Music. He stayed for two years, during which he read about composing and arranging. He earned money working in a food shop and playing the piano in a hotel. In 1968 he wrote the music for, and conducted, a series of pieces that were combined with dance and performed in New York. After returning to Japan, he recorded Palladium, his first album as leader, and appeared on a Helen Merrill album.

In his early career in the late 1960s and early 1970s, Satoh played in a free, percussive style. Satoh played at the 1971 Berlin Jazz Festival as part of a trio; he used a then-unusual ring modulator to alter the sound. Also in the early 1970s, he recorded with Attila Zoller, Karl Berger, and Albert Mangelsdorff. He wrote the psychedelic music for the 1973 anime film Belladonna of Sadness.

Satoh has written arrangements for recordings led by, among others, Merrill, Kimiko Itoh, and Nancy Wilson. He also arranged for strings and quartet on Art Farmer's 1983 album Maiden Voyage.

In 1990 Satoh formed a large group, named Rantooga, that combined various forms of folk musics from around the world. In the early 1990s he composed music for a choir of 1,000 Buddhist monks. In the early 1990s he was reported as stating that 70% of his time was spent on arranging and composing, and the rest on playing and recording.

Compositions
Satoh has composed for film, television and advertisements. For instance, he made the music of Kanashimi no Belladonna, a film in which the sound is very important ; all the songs of this movie are performed by his wife, Chinatsu Nakayama.

Some of his compositions are influenced by the space in the works of composer Toru Takemitsu. Satoh has also composed for traditional Japanese instruments, including the shakuhachi and biwa.

Discography
An asterisk (*) after the year indicates that it is the year of release.

As leader/co-leader

As sideman

References

Bibliography

1941 births
Japanese jazz composers
Japanese jazz pianists
Living people
21st-century pianists
Musicians from Tokyo